Salvatore Torquato is an American theoretical scientist born in Falerna, Italy. His research work has impacted a  variety of fields, including physics,
chemistry, applied and pure mathematics, materials science, engineering, and biological physics. He is the Lewis Bernard Professor of Natural Sciences in the Department of Chemistry and Princeton Institute for the Science and Technology of Materials at Princeton University. He has been a Senior Faculty Fellow in the Princeton Center for Theoretical Science, an enterprise dedicated to exploring frontiers across the theoretical natural sciences. He is  also an Associated Faculty Member in three departments or programs at Princeton University: Physics, Program in Applied and Computational Mathematics, and Mechanical & Aerospace Engineering. On multiple occasions, he was a Member of the  School of Mathematics as well as the School of Natural Sciences at the Institute for Advanced Study, Princeton, New Jersey.

Research accomplishments 

Torquato's research work is centered in statistical mechanics and soft condensed matter theory. A common theme of Torquato’s research work 
is the search for unifying and rigorous principles to elucidate a broad range of physical phenomena.
Often his work has challenged or overturned conventional wisdom, which led to resurgence of various
fields or new research directions. Indeed, the impact of his work has extended well beyond the physical
sciences, including the biological sciences, discrete geometry and number theory. Currently, his published work has been cited over 46,650 times and his h-index is 113 according to his  Google Scholar page.

Torquato has made fundamental contributions to our understanding of the randomness of condensed phases of matter through the identification of sensitive order metrics. He is one of the world's experts on packing problems, including pioneering the notion of the "maximally random jammed" state of particle packings, identifying a Kepler-like conjecture for the densest packings of nonspherical particles, and providing strong theoretical evidence that the densest sphere packings in high dimensions (a problem of importance in digital communications) are counterintuitively disordered, not ordered as in our three-dimensional world. He has devised the premier algorithm to reconstruct microstructures of random media. Torquato formulated the first comprehensive cellular automaton model of cancer growth. He has made seminal contributions to the study of random heterogeneous materials, including writing the highly acclaimed treatise on this subject called "Random Heterogeneous Materials." He is one of the world's authorities on "materials by design" using optimization techniques, including "inverse" statistical mechanics. More recently he introduced a new exotic state of matter called "disordered hyperuniformity", which is intermediate between a crystal and liquid. These states of matter are endowed with novel physical properties.
 A recent study has uncovered that the prime numbers in certain large intervals possess unanticipated order across length scales and represent the first example of a new class of many-particle systems with pure point diffraction patterns, which are called effectively limit-periodic.

Random Heterogeneous Media 

Torquato is a world authority on the theory of random heterogeneous media. This area dates back to the work of James Clerk Maxwell, Lord Rayleigh and Einstein, and has important ramifications in the physical and biological sciences. Random media abound in nature and synthetic situations, and include composites, thin films, colloids, packed beds, foams, microemulsions, blood, bone, animal and plant tissue, sintered materials, and sandstones. The effective transport, mechanical and electromagnetic properties are determined by the ensemble-averaged fields that satisfy the governing partial differential equations. Thus, they depend, in a complex manner, upon the random microstructure of the material via correlation functions, including those that characterize clustering and percolation.

Rigorous Theories: 
Over two decades ago, rigorous progress in predicting the effective properties had been hampered
because of the difficulty involved in characterizing the random microstructures. Torquato broke this
impasse by providing a unified rigorous means of characterizing the microstructures and macroscopic
properties of widely diverse random heterogeneous media. His contributions revolutionized the field,
which culminated in his treatise Random Heterogeneous Materials: Microstructure and Macroscopic
Properties, written almost two decades ago, has been cited over 5,300 times and continues to
greatly influence the field. In an article published in Physical Review X in 2021, Torquato and Jaeuk
Kim formulated the first “nonlocal” exact formula for the effective dynamic dielectric constant tensor
for general composite microstructures that accounts for multiple scattering of electromagnetic waves
to all orders.

Designer Metamaterials via Optimization: 
In 1997, Ole Sigmund and Torquato wrote a seminal paper on the use of the topology optimization
method to design metamaterials with negative thermal expansion or those with zero thermal expansion. 
They also designed 3D anisotropic porous solids with negative Poisson’s ratio to optimize the
performance of piezoelectric composites. Torquato and co-workers were the first to show that
composites whose interfaces are triply periodic minimal surfaces are optimal for multifunctionality.

Degeneracy of Pair Statistics and Structure Reconstructions: 
Torquato and colleagues pioneered a novel and powerful inverse optimization procedure to reconstruct
or construct realizations of disordered many-particle or two-phase systems from lower-order correlation
functions. An outcome is the quantitative and definitive demonstration that pair information
of a disordered many-particle system is insufficient to uniquely determine a representative configuration
and identified more sensitive structural descriptors beyond the standard three-, four-body, etc.
distribution functions, which is of enormous significance in the study of liquid and glassy states of
matter.

Canonical n-Point Correlation Function
In 1986, Torquato formulated a unified theoretical approach to represent exactly a general n-point
"canonical" correlation function Hn from which one can obtain and compute any of the various types
of correlation functions that determine the bulk properties of liquids, glasses and random media, as
well as the generalizations of these correlation functions. The wealth of structural information
contained in Hn is far from understood. More recently, Torquato and colleagues are discovering
connections of special cases of the Hn to the covering and quantizer problems of discrete geometry
as well as to problems in number theory.

Liquids and Glasses 

Torquato is one of the world leaders in the statistical-mechanical theory of liquid and glassy states
of matter. He has made seminal contributions to our understanding of the venerable hard-sphere
model, which has been invoked to study local molecular order, transport phenomena, glass formation,
and freezing behavior in liquids. Other notable research advances concern the theory of water, simple
liquids, and general statistical-mechanical theory of condensed states of matter. He has been at
the forefront of identifying and applying sensitive correlation functions and descriptors to characterize
liquid and glassy structures beyond standard pair statistics. He also is known for extending the
machinery of liquid-state theory to characterize the structure of random media.

Toward the Quantification of Randomness:
Torquato and colleagues pioneered the powerful notion of "order metrics and maps" to characterize
the degree of order/disorder in many-particle systems. Such descriptors were initially applied
to suggest an alternative to the ill-defined random close packed state of sphere packings (described
below). Order metrics have been employed by many investigators to characterize the degree of disorder
in simple liquids, water and structural glasses. Torquato along with his co-workers have used
order metrics to provide novel insights into the structural, thermodynamical, and dynamical nature of
molecular systems, such as Lennard-Jones liquids and glasses, water  and disordered ground
states of matter, among other examples.

g2-Invariant Processes:
Torquato and Stillinger pioneered the notion of g2-invariant processes in which a given nonnegative
pair correlation g2 function remains invariant over the range of densities 0≤ø≤ø*, where ø* is
the maximum achievable density subject to satisfaction of certain necessary conditions on g2.
This idea has spurred great interest in the statistical-mechanical realizability problem: What are the
necessary conditions for the existence of disordered many-particle systems if only the density and g2
are specified?

Inverse Statistical Mechanics: Ground and Excited States:
During the first decade of the present millennium, Torquato and his collaborators pioneered inverse
statistical-mechanical methodologies to find optimized interaction potentials that lead spontaneously
and robustly to a target many-particle configuration, including nanoscale structures, at zero temperature
(ground states) and positive temperatures (excited states). Novel target structures include low coordinated
2D and 3D crystal ground states, disordered ground states as well as atomic
systems with negative Poisson’s ratios over a wide range of temperatures and densities.

Growing Length Scales upon Supercooling a Liquid:
In 2013, Marcotte, Stillinger and Torquato demonstrated that a sensitive signature of the glass transition
of atomic liquid models is apparent well before the transition temperature Tc is reached upon
supercooling as measured by a length scale determined from the volume integral of the direct correlation
function c(r), as defined by the Ornstein-Zernike equation. This length scale grows
appreciably with decreasing temperature.

Perfect Glasses:
In a seminal paper published in 2016, Zheng, Stillinger and Torquato introduced the notion of a "perfect
glass". Such amorphous solids involve many-body interactions that remarkably eliminate the possibilities
of crystalline and quasicrystalline phases for any state variables, while creating mechanically
stable amorphous glasses that are hyperuniform down to absolute zero temperature. Subsequently, it
was shown computationally that perfect glasses possess unique disordered classical ground states up
to trivial symmetries and hence have vanishing entropy: a highly counterintuitive situation. This
discovery provides singular examples in which entropy and disorder are at odds with one another.

Packing Problems

Torquato is one of the world’s foremost authorities on packing problems, such as how densely or
randomly nonoverlapping particles can fill a volume. They are among the most ancient and persistent
problems in mathematics and science. Packing problems are intimately related to condensed phases
of matter, including classical ground states, liquids, crystals and glasses. While the preponderance of
work before 2000 considered sphere packings, Torquato and his colleagues spearheaded the study
of the densest and disordered jammed packings of nonspherical particles (e.g., ellipsoids, polyhedra,
superballs, among other shapes) since then, which has resulted in an explosion of papers on this
topic.

Maximally Random Jammed (MRJ) Packings:
In a seminal Physical Review Letters in 2000, Torquato together with Thomas Truskett and Pablo Debenedetti 
demonstrated that the venerable notion of random close packing in sphere packings is
mathematically ill-defined and replaced it with a new concept called the maximally random jammed
(MRJ) state. This was made possible by pioneering the idea of scalar metrics of order (or disorder),
which opened new avenues of research in condensed-matter physics, and by introducing mathematically
precise jamming categories. MRJ packings have come to be viewed as prototypical
glasses because they are maximally disordered (according to different order metrics) and infinitely
mechanically rigid.  Michael Klatt and Torquato characterized various correlation functions as well
as transport and electromagnetic properties of MRJ sphere packings.

Together with Aleksandar Donev, Paul Chaikin, Robert Connelly, we discovered that MRJ packings of
identical ellipsoids can have much higher densities than their spherical counterpart. Elsewhere,
the same authors found the densest known packings of identical ellipsoids with densities that are
appreciably higher than the provably densest sphere packing (e.g., FCC lattice packing).

Dense Packings of Polyhedra:
In a pioneering paper published in the PNAS in 2006, John Conway and Torquato analytically constructed
packings of tetrahedra that doubled the density of the best known packings at that time.
In another seminal paper published in Nature in 2009, Torquato and Jiao determined the densest
known packings of the non-tiling Platonic solids (tetrahedra, octahedron, icosahedron and dodecahedron)
as well as the thirteen Archimedean solids. The Torquato-Jiao conjecture states that the
densest packings of the Platonic and Archimedean solids with central symmetry (which constitute the
majority of them) are given by their corresponding densest Bravais lattice packings. They also
conjectured that the optimal packing of any convex, identical polyhedron without central symmetry
generally is not a Bravais lattice packing. To date, there are no counterexamples to these conjectures,
which are based on certain theoretical considerations. Torquato’s work on polyhedra spurred a flurry
of activity in the physics and mathematics communities to determine the densest possible packings of
such solids, including dramatic improvements on the density of regular tetrahedra.

Disordered Sphere Packings May Win in High Dimensions:
Torquato and Stillinger derived a conjectural lower bound on the maximal density of sphere packings
in arbitrary Euclidean space dimension d whose large-d asymptotic behavior is controlled by
2-(0:77865...)d. This work may remarkably provide the putative exponential improvement on Minkowski’s
100-year-old bound for Bravais lattices, the dominant asymptotic term of which is 1/2d. These results
suggest that the densest packings in sufficiently high dimensions may be disordered rather than
periodic, implying the existence of disordered classical ground states for some continuous potentials
– a counterintuitive and profound result.

Packing Algorithms:
Donev, Stillinger and Torquato formulated a collision-driven molecular dynamics algorithm to create
dense packings of smoothy shaped non-spherical particles, within a parallelepiped simulation domain,
under both periodic or hard-wall boundary conditions. Torquato and Jiao devised the so-called
adaptative-shrinking-cell (ASC) optimization scheme to generate dense packings of ordered and disordered
spheres across dimensions using linear programming  as well as dense packings of ordered
and disordered nonspherical particles (including polyhedra) via Monte Carlo methods.

Hyperuniformity

In a seminal article published in 2003, Torquato and Stillinger introduced the "hyperuniformity" concept
to characterize the large-scale density fluctuations of ordered and disordered point configurations.
A hyperuniform many-particle system in d-dimensional Euclidean space Rd is characterized by
an anomalous suppression of large-scale density fluctuations relative to those in typical disordered
systems, such as liquids and amorphous solids. As such, the hyperuniformity concept generalizes the
traditional notion of long-range order to include not only all perfect crystals and quasicrystals, but also
exotic disordered states of matter, which have the character of crystals on large length scales but are
isotropic like liquids.

Disordered hyperuniform systems and their manifestations were largely unknown in the scientific community
about two decades ago. Now there is a realization that these systems play a vital role in a
number of problems across the physical, materials, mathematical, and biological sciences. Torquato
and co-workers have contributed to these developments  by showing that these exotic states of
matter can be obtained via both equilibrium and nonequilibrium routes and come in both quantum mechanical
and classical varieties. The study of hyperuniform states of matter is an emerging multidisciplinary
field, influencing and linking developments across the physical sciences, mathematics and
biology. In particular, the hybrid crystal-liquid attribute of disordered hyperuniform materials endows
them with unique or nearly optimal, direction-independent physical properties and robustness against
defects, which makes them an intense subject of research.

Generalizations of Hyperuniformity to Two-Phase Media, Scalar Fields, Vector Fields and Spin Systems: 
Torquato generalized the hyperuniformity concept to heterogeneous media. More recently, 
Torquato extended hyperuniformity to encompass scalar random fields (e.g., concentration and temperature
fields, spinodal decomposition), vector fields (e.g., turbulent velocity fields) and statistically
anisotropic many-particle systems. This study led to the idea of “directional hyperuniformity”
in reciprocal space. Torquato, Robert Distasio, Roberto Car and colleagues have generalized the
hyperuniformity idea to spin systems. Recently, Duyu Chen and Torquato formulated a Fourier space-
based optimization approach to construct, at will, two-phase hyperuniform media with prescribed
spectral densities. To more completely characterize density fluctuations of point configurations,
Torquato, Kim and Klatt carried out an extensive theoretical and computational study of the
higher-order moments or cumulants, including the skewness, excess kurtosis, and the corresponding
probability distribution function of a large family of models across the first three space dimensions,
including both hyperuniform and nonhyperuniform systems with varying degrees of short- and long-range
order, and determined when a central limit theorem was achieved.

Hyperuniformity in Quantum Systems:
Torquato, together Antonello Scardicchio, have rigorously shown the certain ground states of fermionic
systems in any space dimension d are disordered and hyperuniform. Daniel Abreu, Torquato and
colleagues proved that Weyl–Heisenberg ensembles are hyperuniform. Such ensembles include
as a special case a multi-layer extension of the Ginibre ensemble modeling the distribution of electrons
in higher Landau levels, which is responsible for the quantum Hall effect. More recently, it was
shown that there are interesting quantum phase transitions in long-range interacting hyperuniform spin
chains in a transverse field.

Hyperuniformity in Biology:
Jiao, Torquato, Joseph Corbo and colleagues presented the first example of disordered hyperuniformity
found in biology, namely, photoreceptor cells in avian retina. Birds are highly visual animals
with five different cone photoreceptor subtypes, yet their photoreceptor patterns are irregular, which
less than ideal to sample light. By analyzing chicken cone photoreceptors, consisting of five different
cell types, it was found that the disordered patterns are hyperuniform, but with a twist - both the
total population and the individual cell types are simultaneously hyperuniform. This multihyperuniformity
property is crucial for the acute color vision possessed by birds. Elsewhere, Lomba, Torquato
and co-workers presented the first statistical-mechanical model that rigorously achieves disordered
multihyperuniformity in ternary mixtures to sample the three primary colors: red, blue and green.

Stealthy and Hyperuniform Disordered Ground States:
Torquato, Stillinger and colleagues pioneered the collective-coordinate numerical optimization approach
to generate systems of particles interacting with isotropic "stealthy" bounded long-ranged pair
potentials (similar to Friedel oscillations) whose classical ground states are counterintuitively disordered,
hyperuniform, and highly degenerate across space dimensions. "Stealthy" means
that there is zero scattering for a range of wavevectors around the origin. A singular feature of such
systems is that dimensionality of the configuration space depends on the fraction of such constrained
wave vectors compared to the number of degrees of freedom. Nonetheless, a statistical-mechanical
theory for stealthy ground-state thermodynamics and structure has been formulated.

Novel Disordered Photonic Materials:
About a decade ago, it was believed that photonic crystals (dielectric networks with crystal symmetries)
were required to achieve large complete (both polarizations and all directions) photonic band
gaps. Such materials can be thought of a omnidirectional mirrors but for a finite range of frequencies. 
By mapping the aforementioned "stealthy" disordered ground-state particle configurations to
corresponding dielectric networks, Marain Florescu, Paul Steinhardt and Torquato discovered the first disordered
network solids with complete photonic band gaps comparable in size to photonic crystals but with the
added advantage that the band gaps are completely isotropic. It was shown both theoretically and
experimentally that the latter property enables one to design free-form waveguides not possible with
crystals.

Disordered Hyperuniform Materials with Optimal Transport and Elastic Properties:
Zhang, Stillinger and Torquato showed that stealthy disordered two-phase systems can attain nearly
maximal effective diffusion coefficients over a broad range of volume fractions while also maintaining
isotropy. Torquato and Chen discovered that the effective thermal (or electrical) conductivities
and elastic moduli of 2D disordered hyperuniform low-density cellular networks are optimal under
the constraint of statistical isotropy. Elsewhere, Torquato found that hyperuniform porous media
possess singular fluid flow characteristics.

Disordered Hyperuniform Materials with Novel Wave Characteristics:
Kim and Torquato demonstrated that stealthy disordered two-phase systems can be made to be perfectly
transparent to both elastic and electromagnetic waves for a wide range of incident frequencies.

Creation of Large Disordered Hyperuniform Systems via Computational and Experimental Methods:
Recently, Torquato and co-workers have formulated protocols to create and synthesize large hyperuniform
samples that are effectively hyperuniform down to the nanoscale, which had been a stumbling
block. Kim and Torquato formulated a new tessellation-based computational procedure to design extremely
large perfectly hyperuniform disordered dispersions (more than 108 particles) for materials
discovery via 3D printing techniques. Self-assembly techniques offer a path to fabricate large
samples at much smaller length scales. More recently, Ma, Lomba and Torquato a feasible experimental
protocol to create very large hyperuniform systems was proposed using binary paramagnetic
colloidal particles. The strong and long-ranged dipolar interaction induced by a tunable magnetic
field is free from screening effects that attenuate long-ranged electrostatic interactions in charged
colloidal systems.

Characterization of the Hyperuniformity of Quasicrystals:
Zachary and Torquato computed the hyperuniformity order metric, derived from the asymptotic number
variance, for first time for quasicrystals: 1D Fibonacci chain and 2D Penrose tiling. The characterization
of the hyperuniformity of quasicrystals via the structure factor S(k) is considerably more
subtle than that for crystals because the former are characterized by a dense set of Bragg peaks. To
do so, Erdal Oguz, Joshua Socolar, Steinhardt and Torquato employed the integrated structure factor
to ascertain the hyperuniformity of quasicrystals. The same authors demonstrated elsewhere
that certain one-dimensional substitution tilings can either be hyperuniform or anti-hyperuniform.
Cheney Lin, Steinhardt and Torquato determined how the hyperuniformity metric in quasicrystals depends
on the local isomorphism class.

Hyperuniformity in the Distribution of the Prime Numbers:
Torquato, together with Matthew De Courcy-Ireland and Zhang, discovered that the prime numbers
in a distinguished limit are hyperuniform with dense Bragg peaks (like a quasicrystal) but positioned
at certain rational wavenumbers, like a limit-periodic point pattern, but with an “erratic” pattern of
occupied and unoccupied sites. The discovery of this hidden multiscale order in the primes is in
contradistinction to their traditional treatment as pseudo-random numbers.

Honors and awards

Torquato is a Fellow of the American Physical Society (APS), Fellow of the Society for Industrial and Applied Mathematics (SIAM)  and Fellow of the American Society of Mechanical Engineers (ASME). He is the recipient of the 2017 ASC Joel Henry Hildebrand Award, the 2009 APS David Adler Lectureship Award in Material Physics, SIAM Ralph E. Kleinman Prize, Society of Engineering Science William Prager Medal  and ASME Richards Memorial Award. He was a Guggenheim Fellow. He has been a Member of the Institute for Advanced Study on four separate occasions. He recently received a Simons Foundation Fellowship in Theoretical Physics.

Selected publications

 M. A. Klatt, P. J. Steinhardt, and S. Torquato, Phoamtonic Designs Yield Sizeable 3D Photonic Band Gaps, Proceedings of the National Academy of Sciences, 116(47) 23480-23486 (2019).
 G. Zhang and S. Torquato, Realizable Hyperuniform and Nonhyperuniform Particle Configurations with Targeted Spectral Functions via Effective Pair Interactions, Physical Review E, 101 032124 (2020).
 J. Kim and S. Torquato, Multifunctional Composites for Elastic and Electromagnetic Wave Propagation, Proceedings of the National Academy of Sciences of the United States of America, 117(16) 8764-8774 (2020).
 C. E. Maher, F. H. Stillinger, and S. Torquato, Kinetic Frustration Effects on Dense Two-Dimensional Packings of Convex Particles and Their Structural Characteristics, Journal of Physical Chemistry B, 125, 2450 (2021).
 Z. Ma, E. Lomba, and S. Torquato, Optimized Large Hyperuniform Binary Colloidal Suspensions in Two Dimensions, Physical Review Letters, 125 068002 (2020).
 H. Wang, F. H. Stillinger and S. Torquato, Sensitivity of Pair Statistics on Pair Potentials in Many-Body Systems, The Journal of Chemical Physics, 153 124106 (2020).
 A. Bose and S. Torquato, Quantum phase transitions in long-range interacting hyperuniform spin chains in a transverse field, Physical Review B, 103 014118 (2021).
 S. Yu, C. W. Qiu, Y. Chong, S. Torquato, and N. Park, Engineered disorder in photonics, Nature Reviews Materials, 6 226 (2021).
 S. Torquato and J. Kim, Nonlocal Effective Electromagnetic Wave Characteristics of Composite Media: Beyond the Quasistatic Regime, Physical Review X, 11, 021002 (2021).
 S. Torquato, J. Kim, and M. A. Klatt, Local Number Fluctuations in Hyperuniform and Nonhyperuniform Systems: Higher-Order Moments and Distribution Functions, Physical Review X, 11, 021028 (2021).
 S. Torquato, Structural characterization of many-particle systems on approach to hyperuniform states, Physical Review E, 103 052126 (2021).
 M. Skolnick, and S. Torquato, Understanding degeneracy of two-point correlation functions via Debye random media, Physical Review E, 104 045306 (2021).

External links
[Prof. Torquato's Princeton University Webpage: https://torquato.princeton.edu]

References

21st-century American physicists
Theoretical physicists
American people of Italian descent
Syracuse University alumni
Princeton University faculty
Fellows of the American Physical Society
Living people
Year of birth missing (living people)